Hiltrud Kellner, sometimes Hiltrud Kellner de Zozaya (born 1913, date of death unknown) was a Uruguayan composer of Romanian origin.

Kellner was born in Transylvania, which was then part of the Austro-Hungarian Empire. Kellner was married to the Mexican composer Carlos Zozaya, and with him lived in Uruguay for many years. He was among her instructors; other teachers included  and Héctor Tosar. She composed a number of works for orchestra, including a piano concerto. Kellner is deceased.

References

1913 births
Year of death missing
Romanian emigrants to Uruguay
Uruguayan classical composers
Women classical composers
20th-century classical composers
20th-century women composers
Uruguayan people of Romanian descent